Taeniotes amazonum is a species of beetle in the family Cerambycidae. It was described by James Thomson in 1857. It is known from Bolivia, Argentina, and Brazil, and it has been introduced into Azores.

References

amazonum
Beetles described in 1857